Allan McGraw (29 July 1939 – 1 March 2023) was a Scottish football player and manager, most associated with Greenock Morton.

Playing career
McGraw started his playing career with Greenock Morton. Playing in Division Two he set a Scottish record for most goals scored in a season. He finished as Morton's top goalscorer in five consecutive seasons, and appeared in the 1963 League Cup final. He helped the club to promotion to the top flight in 1964, having scored a record 61 goals in 52 appearances that season. It was the first time Morton had played at that level since 1952, but two seasons later the Ton were relegated back to the Second Division.

Following that relegation, Morton sold McGraw to Hibernian for £15,000 (£ today). He scored eight goals in his first 11 appearances for Hibs, including wins against Hearts and Rangers. McGraw scored a goal which meant that the club reached the 1969 League Cup final, but he was unable to play in the final due to injury. McGraw had been stretchered off during the semi-final, but later returned to the field as Hibs had already used their one permitted substitute. He took a number of pain killing injections in order to play while injured. This ruined his knees, causing great pain and necessitating the use of walking sticks for the rest of his life. He later played for Linfield for one season and spent a season back at Morton without appearing in a league match.

Managerial career
McGraw returned to Morton as manager in 1985. Players he managed included Derek McInnes, John Anderson, David Wylie and Alan Mahood. Towards the end of his time as manager, McGraw's team missed promotion to the Scottish Premier Division by one goal in the 1995-96 season.

Personal life and death
McGraw stood for election as an independent for West Renfrewshire in the 1999 Scottish Parliament election. His son Mark also played for both Morton and Hibs.

McGraw died on 1 March 2023, at the age of 83.

Honours

Player
Morton
Scottish Division Two: 1963–64

Individual
Scottish Division Two top scorer: 1963–64

Manager
Greenock Morton
Scottish First Division: 1986–87
Scottish Second Division: 1994–95

Individual
Scottish First Division Manager of the Year: 1986–87
Scottish PFA Second Division Manager of the Year: 1994–95

Lifetime achievement
Scottish Football Hall of Fame inductee: 2017
Scottish PFA Special Merit Award: 1998

References

External Links

1939 births
2023 deaths
Greenock Morton F.C. managers
Greenock Morton F.C. non-playing staff
Greenock Morton F.C. players
Hibernian F.C. players
Linfield F.C. players
toronto City players
Scottish Football League players
Scottish football managers
Scottish footballers
People from Govan
Footballers from Glasgow
Scottish Football League managers
Renfrew F.C. players
Scottish Football Hall of Fame inductees
Association football forwards